No Redeeming Social Value, also known as NRSV, is an American hardcore punk band. The band was started in 1988 by the brothers D Thrilla and K9 the sonic Maximizer of the Queens Village neighborhood of New York City. Alcohol, marijuana and parties are major themes in the group's music.

History
The group was formed primarily to play a battle of the bands at the local Queens Village church Our Lady of Lourdes in 1988.  Most songs were jokes and paid tribute to the legendary local bands Norman Bates and the Showerheads and Six and Violence.   After a surprising turnout and mass appeal they decided to continue to play locally and record demo tapes and 7-inch records.  At this point they acquired drummer Vinnie Value, second vocalist Mike Dixon and bassist Scott Cumbo to replace the members who left the original line-up. No Redeeming Social Value had a run on the local Queens Heavy Metal circuit in the late 1980s and early 1990s. Eventually, with the help of the Lower East Side band Warzone (band) and local punk DJ Johnny Stiff, they began to play many hardcore punk matinee shows in Manhattan. The band's first LP release Rocks the Party on SFT Records led to opportunities for national and international tours. No Redeeming Social Value currently plays shows sporadically throughout the year.

The band is featured in the hardcore punk documentary N.Y.H.C.. The band's song "Clueless" is used in the video game Backyard Wrestling 2: There Goes the Neighborhood.

Members

Current 
D Thrilla, stage name Major Damage, voice
K9 the Sonic Maximizer stage name K-Love, guitars
John Franko, bass
Glen Lorieo, stage name Seeweed, beats
Dick Van Butlett, Olde English bottle

Former 
Mike Dixon, second vocals and spiritual advisor
Vinnie Value, percussion
Scott Cumbo, bass
Pete "the Meat" Larussa, drums
Big Bud, blunt tech
Insane James, drums
Rich Hoak (of Brutal Truth), drums
Kevin Gill, Occasional Vocals

Discography 

No Redeeming Social Value demo
Negative Image 7-inch
N.Y.H.C. (1996)
Three Way Dance (1998)
THC (1999)
Hardcore Your Lousy Ass Off (2000) 7-inch
40 Oz. of Hardcore (2001) LP
Still Drinking (2007) LP
High in Holland LP
Skinheads Rule 7-inch
Rocks the Party (1997) LP
Drunken Chicken Style EP
America's Favorite Hardcore Band EP
Wasted for Life (2020)

References 

Hardcore punk groups from New York (state)
Musical groups established in 1988
1988 establishments in New York City
Musical groups from Queens, New York
Triple Crown Records artists